Dorea is a Gram-positive and nonspore-forming bacterial genus from the family Lachnospiraceae, which occur in human faeces.

References

Further reading 
 

Lachnospiraceae
Bacteria genera
Taxa described in 2002